The Albertine Prize is a French literary award granted to French writing in translation that has been publicly recognised in the United States of America. It is awarded by the Cultural Services of the French Embassy in the United States of America, with financial support from Van Cleef & Arpels.

History 
The Albertine Prize was constituted as a readers' choice award, to recognize popular works written in French and translated to English, with an American audience. The purpose of the prize was to establish recognition for contemporary French literature, in translation in the United States. The Prize is awarded from the Albertine Bookstore, which was established by Antonin Baudry, then Cultural Counselor for the French Embassy, in New York.

A selection committee nominates a shortlist of novels each year, and readers vote for the winner on the website of the Albertine Bookstore. The winner is awarded a prize of  $10,000 prize, which is divided 80-20 between the author and translator.

In addition to the Albertine Prize, the Albertine Prize Jeunesse is awarded to books for young readers, and the winner is chosen by children between the ages of 3 to 14, grouped into four categories by age.

List of nominees and winners

2021  
2021 nominees:

2020  
The Selection Committee for the 2020 Prize included staff of the Albertine Bookstore, the Book Department in the French Embassy, French literary critic François Busnel and American writer Rachel Kushner. The shortlist was announced on 14 October 2020 and voting remained open until 24 November 2020.

2019 
The panel that shortlisted books for the 2019 prize included staff of the Albertine Bookstore, the Book Department in the French Embassy, French literary critic François Bushnel and American writer Lydia Davis.

2018 
The panel that shortlisted books for the 2018 prize included staff of the Albertine Bookstore, the Book Department in the French Embassy, French literary critic François Bushnel and American writer Lydia Davis.

2017 
The panel that shortlisted books for the 2018 prize included staff of the Albertine Bookstore, the Book Department in the French Embassy, French literary critic François Bushnel and American writer Lydia Davis.

References 

French literary awards
Translation awards